Roger Kingdom  (born August 26, 1962) is an American former sprint hurdler who was twice Olympic champion in the 110 meters. Kingdom set a world record of 12.92 in 1989. He is now an athletics coach and strength and conditioning coach who currently works as a speed and conditioning coach for the Tampa Bay Buccaneers of the NFL.

Early life and athletics
Born in Vienna, Georgia, an athlete of note Kingdom excelled at the high jump and discus in his formative years as well as being a noteworthy American football player. He attended the University of Pittsburgh originally on a football scholarship but excelled on the school's track team winning the NCAA outdoor national championship in the 110 meter hurdles in 1983 and the NCAA indoor national championship in the 55 meter hurdles in 1984.

He had a long and distinguished career on the track in the 110 meter high hurdles, winning his first Olympic gold medal in the 1984 Summer Olympics. In 1988, he was unbeaten all season and was the favorite to retain his Olympic title in the 1988 Summer Olympics in Seoul, South Korea. In a stunning display of technique, power, and speed, he won by three meters, becoming the first man to run below the 13 second barrier in an Olympic final, running 12.98s. This record stood until 1996 when Allen Johnson broke it at the Atlanta Games. Kingdom is only the second athlete to have successfully defended his 110 m hurdle Olympic title, after Lee Calhoun, who won the gold medal in both 1956 and 1960.

Kingdom set a 110 m high hurdles World Record of 12.92 seconds in Zürich, Switzerland in 1989. This stood until August 20, 1993 when it was beaten by 1/100th of a second by Colin Jackson of Great Britain in Stuttgart, Germany, a subsequent record that stood for 13 years.

His progress was hampered some in 1991 when he underwent surgery to repair ACL damage and remove bone chips from his knee. He returned to competition to win the gold medal in the 1995 Pan American Games and the bronze medal in the 1995 World Championships in Athletics.

Kingdom retired from active athletic competition in 1999.

In 2006, Kingdom was inducted into the Pennsylvania Sports Hall of Fame. He was inducted along with NFL's Bap Manzini and MLB's Jim Russell.

In 2018, Kingdom was included in the inaugural class of the University of Pittsburgh Pitt Athletics Hall of Fame

Coaching
Kingdom joined the California University of Pennsylvania's athletics staff as an assistant Track & Field and Cross Country coach in 2004. He then became the director of both teams in 2006.

On March 6, 2014, Kingdom was hired as the assistant strength and conditioning coach for the NFL's Arizona Cardinals. Kingdom worked with head strength and conditioning coach Buddy Morris, his own strength coach at the University of Pittsburgh, and focused on improving the team's speed.

Kingdom then spent the 2018 season as the Interim Director of Track & Field/Cross Country at the University of Central Florida

In 2019, Kingdom returned to the NFL as the speed and conditioning coach of the Tampa Bay Buccaneers. In Tampa, he again worked under head coach Bruce Arians, who was the Cardinals’ head coach during Kingdom’s tenure in Arizona.

In 2021, Kingdom won a Super Bowl title in Super Bowl LV.

Personal life
Kingdom is a member of Omega Psi Phi fraternity.

He currently resides in Orlando, Florida with his wife, Mary. They have three daughters: Jierra, Cierra and Carina.

Achievements
(110 m hurdles unless stated)
1983
1983 NCAA Outdoor Track and Field Championship
collegiate national champion, 13.53 sec.
1983 Pan American Games - Caracas, Venezuela
gold medal 13.44 seconds
1984
1984 NCAA Indoor Track and Field Championship
55m hurdles collegiate national champion, 7.08 sec
1984 Summer Olympics - Los Angeles, U.S.
gold medal 13.20 sec.
1988
1988 Summer Olympics - Seoul, South Korea
gold medal 12.98 sec.
1989
1989 IAAF World Cup - Barcelona, Spain
gold medal 12.87 sec. Wind Aided
1989 IAAF World Indoor Championships - Budapest, Hungary
60 m hurdles gold medal 7.43 sec.  
1990
Goodwill Games - Seattle, USA
gold medal 13.47 sec.
1995
1995 World Championships in Athletics - Gothenburg, Sweden
bronze medal 13.19 sec.

See also
Olympic medalists in athletics

References

External links
Georgia Sports Hall of Fame
 Roger Kingdom highlights

1962 births
Living people
People from Vienna, Georgia
Sportspeople from Pennsylvania
American male hurdlers
African-American male track and field athletes
Olympic gold medalists for the United States in track and field
Athletes (track and field) at the 1984 Summer Olympics
Athletes (track and field) at the 1988 Summer Olympics
Medalists at the 1984 Summer Olympics
Medalists at the 1988 Summer Olympics
Pan American Games track and field athletes for the United States
Pan American Games medalists in athletics (track and field)
Pan American Games gold medalists for the United States
Athletes (track and field) at the 1983 Pan American Games
Athletes (track and field) at the 1995 Pan American Games
World Athletics Championships athletes for the United States
World Athletics Championships medalists
Pittsburgh Panthers men's track and field athletes
Universiade medalists in athletics (track and field)
University of Pittsburgh alumni
Goodwill Games medalists in athletics
Track & Field News Athlete of the Year winners
Universiade gold medalists for the United States
IAAF World Athlete of the Year
World Athletics Indoor Championships winners
Medalists at the 1989 Summer Universiade
Competitors at the 1990 Goodwill Games
Medalists at the 1983 Pan American Games
Medalists at the 1995 Pan American Games
21st-century African-American people
20th-century African-American sportspeople